Kalianpur railway station is a small railway station in Kanpur district, Uttar Pradesh. Its code is KAP. It serves Kalianpur city. The station consists of three platforms.

Formerly the metre-gauge line ran through Kalianpur and was connected to Brahmavarta station in Bithoor. But due to conversion of the metre-gauge railway line to broad-gauge line the railway route to Bithoor was subsequently closed and the Brahvarta station now remains deserted. The Indian Railways have decided to extend line from Mandhana Central-Safipur Junction via Brahmavart. There were vital demands from the public to restart the railway route connecting Kanpur Central railway station to Brahmavarta, Bithoor though the matter remains reserved.

References

Railway stations in Kanpur Nagar district
Lucknow NER railway division
Railway stations in Kanpur
Transport in Kanpur